The 2006 Conference USA Football Championship Game was played on December 1, 2006 at Robertson Stadium in Houston to determine the 2006 football champion of the Conference USA (C-USA). The game featured the Southern Miss Golden Eagles, the East Division champions, and the Houston Cougars, the West Division champions. The game kicked off at 8:00pm EST and was televised by ESPN2.

Game summary 

With the win, the Houston Cougars won the second-ever Conference USA championship game and grabbed their first Conference championship since 1996.

Scoring summary

References

Championship
Conference USA Football Championship Game
Houston Cougars football games
Southern Miss Golden Eagles football games
Sports competitions in Houston
December 2006 sports events in the United States
Conference USA Football Championship
2006 in Houston